As the first established caliphate, following the Islamic Conquest beginning in 622 AD, the Umayyads captured and occupied the former Byzantine and Sasanian Empires, from Mesopotamia to the Iberian Peninsula until 750 AD. This initial period was catalysed after the death of Muhammad, and marked the formative years of Islamic art.

Visual culture of umayyad
The conversation between Islamic art and other monotheistic religions, such as Judaism and Christianity, that co-existed alongside Muslim rule during the Middle Ages, can be depicted through decorative compositions. These can range from the display of geometric arrangements, to figural imagery in specific contexts. For example,

This made Islamic art distinctive, and the longevity of these forms of architecture was significantly better than ones of a portable nature. For example, permanent artistic features within palatial residences included mosaics and friezes of intricate iconography. 'Senmurvs' were an example of carvings - metamorphic forms that emerged during the Sasanian period (between the third and seventh centuries); produced and inspired by mythology, such as griffins.

Graeco-Roman influences were also littered among Umayyad stucco scenes, such as fruit-bearing vine scrolls and floral depictions that would have symbolised ‘supernatural fertility of paradise’. Furthermore, acanthus-like scrolls of greenery can also be seen in the sculpture of the ancient Roman Ara Pacis, that inspired Islamic motifs and stylistic constructions.

Similarly, these designs also featured on the Dome of The Rock, Jerusalem, that was also erected in the early eighth century. This site also reflects the importance of Syria and its Abrahamic associations to the Umayyad caliphate based in Damascus. It could be considered a patronage of monumental architecture, containing such ornate materials that continue a tradition of the Late Antiquity, but reconfigured in interesting and innovative ways.

Similarly, the mihrab and the dome above the Great Mosque of Cordoba was decorated in blue, green and gold mosaics, that posed somewhat of a rival to the Great Mosque in western culture.

Alternatively, supplemented by formal modes of development by the Byzantines and Sassanians, metalwork, textiles, depiction of animal, vegetal and figural motifs were influenced by Late Antiquity and naturalistic tradition, which had been prevalent from the eastern Mediterranean.

Despite this, coinage is the best evidence to depict a visual identity of the Umayyads of Syria, with bronze examples being found in Qasr al-Mushatta after their minting had begun in 719-20 AD, Palestine.

Significance of art 
Arguably, as one of the driving forces in establishing the Umayyad rule, compositions in this period of the Late Antiquity 'were the earliest expressions of Islamic art on a grand scale’. Not only did the first caliphal rulers establish a distinctive, stylistic trend that identified their emerging culture to support the spread of Islam, but further used this to form a web of alliances with alternative kingdoms that once occupied the fringes of the Mediterranean.

From Umayyad art, it is visible to see the adoption and development of techniques and styles in the later Abbasid art period. For example, the 'Samarian Dancers' wall painting.

Umayyad art can be attributed with starting the confluence of ‘east’ and ‘west’ art which continued throughout caliphal devoplment. This viewpoint is consistently popular as they did not appear to conform to a fixed artistic binary, thereby applying a more 'holistic' approach to the study of significant Umayyad architecture.

References 

Umayyad Caliphate
History of Syria